Papilio krishna, the Krishna peacock, is a large swallowtail butterfly found in forests in China, Nepal, north east India, Myanmar and Vietnam.

Description
 A large beautiful butterfly with a prominent swallowtail, the Krishna peacock has a wingspan of 
 It has black upper forewings with a thin prominent yellow discal band running across the wing, parallel to the body.
 The upper hindwing has a large blue discal patch which tapers off into a greenish yellow band from its lower edges inwards towards the dorsum. It has a series of red-mauve capped crescents (usually five).
 The upper hindwing discal band appears on the under hindwing also as a prominent curved yellow discal band.

Resembles Papilio paris generally, but differs in many points as follows: Upperside: ground colour more of a brownish black, irrorated similarly to parti with, green scales, but the scales smaller and more sparsely spread. Forewing: the postdiscal transverse band well defined, complete, formed of white scaling with only a thin sprinkling of green scales on its inner margin, generally erect or slightly curved, rarely slightly sinuous. Hindwing: upper discal patch metallic greenish blue, smaller than in P. paris, but the portions of it in interspaces 6 and 7 more extended towards the termen, the metallic golden-green band that joins the patch on its inner side to the dorsal margin more conspicuous than in P. paris; the tornal ocellus as in P. paris, but above it a subterminal series of claret-red lunules in interspaces 2, 3, 4 and 5, followed by a series of ochraceous-red obscure terminal narrow lunules in the interspaces, the cilia on the outer margin of each conspicuously white. Underside: forewing as in P. paris but an erect ochraceous-white postdiscal band as on the upperside limits; the series of internervular pale streaks on the outer half of the wing. Hindwing: a well-defined discal ochraceous-white band formed of a series of somewhat lunular marks in the interspaces, these increase in width anteriorly; a subterminal series of claret-red lunules traversed by violet scaling on the inner side as in P. paris, but much broader and more prominent; finally a terminal series of ochraceous-yellow lunular marks in the interspaces; the cilia that border each lunule white. Antennae, head, thorax and abdomen as in P. paris.

Range
Sikkim, Bhutan, Darjeeling, Nagaland, Manipur, Myanmar and all around the Himalayas.

Status
The IUCN Red Data Book records the status of the Krishna peacock as uncommon. It is not known to be threatened, though like all peacocks, it is highly sought in trade.

Habitat

Food plants
The following food plants from family Rutaceae have been recorded:
 Evodia fraxinifolia
 Citrus species
 Zanthoxylum species

See also
Papilionidae
List of butterflies of India
List of butterflies of India (Papilionidae)

References

Other reading
Erich Bauer and Thomas Frankenbach, 1998 Schmetterlinge der Erde, Butterflies of the World Part I (1), Papilionidae Papilionidae I: Papilio, Subgenus Achillides, Bhutanitis, Teinopalpus. Edited by Erich Bauer and Thomas Frankenbach. Keltern: Goecke & Evers; Canterbury: Hillside Books, 
 
 
 
 
 

krishna
Butterflies of Asia
Butterflies of Indochina
Butterflies described in 1857